Kulukkallur is a village and gram panchayat in Pattambi Taluk, Palakkad district in the state of Kerala, India.

Demographics
 India census, Kulukkallur had a population of 27,971, of which 13,174 are males and 14,797 are females. In Kulukkallur village population of children under six years of age is 3658 which makes up 13.08% of total population of village. Child Sex Ratio for the Kulukkallur as per census is 997, higher than Kerala average of 964. In 10 years since 2001, Population of the village has increased by 8.3%. In 2001 census total population of Kulukkallur village was about 26 thousand.

Kulukkallur Grama Panchayat LSGI Election -2020

Ward No.     Ward Name	Elected Members	Role	Party	Reservation

1	CHUNDAMPATTA	JASEELA	Member	IUML	Woman

2	NATYAMANGALAM NORTH	ISHAQ T.K	Vice President	CPI(M)	General

3	NATYAMANGALAM	AMEERUNNEESA	Member	IUML	Woman

4	CHUNDAMPATTA EAST	RAJANI. P	Member	CPI(M)	Woman

5	THATHNAMPULLY	MISITHA SOORAJ	Member	INC	General

6	THATHNAMPULLY SOUTH	KADEEJA M K	Member	IUML	Woman

7	MAPPATUKARA WEST	SAHEERA NOUSHAD	Member	CPI(M)	Woman

8	MAPPATUKARA EAST	JAMEELA Teacher 	Member	INC	Woman

9	PURAMATHRA	V. RAMANI	President	CPI(M)	General

10	PURAMATHRA SOUTH	ROSHNI S. RAJ	Member	CPI(M)	Woman

11	KULUKKALLUR	M.K SREEKUMAR	Member	CPI(M)	General

12	ERAVATHRA	KUNJIMUHAMMED	Member	IUML	General

13	MULAYANKAVU SOUTH	LEELA.V.P	Member	IUML	SC Woman

14	MULAYANKAVU NORTH	BALAGANGADHARAN	Member	CPI(M)	General

15	VANDUMTHARA	ASIA P.K	Member	CPI(M)	Woman

16	VALIYAPARAMBU	VENUGOPALAN.K	Member	CPI(M)	SC

17	CHUNDAMPATTA WEST	N.P SUDHAKARAN	Member	CPI(M)	General

Kulukkallur Grama Panchayat LSGI Election -2015

Ward No.	Ward Name	Elected Members	Role	Party	Reservation

1	CHUNDAMPATTA	VIRALIKKATTIL NUSAIBA ASHARAF	Member	CPI(M)	Woman

2	NATYAMANGALAM NORTH	M K.RASHEEDA GAFOOR	Member	INC	Woman

3	NATYAMANGALAM	M. SAIDALAVI MASTER	Member	IUML	General

4	CHUNDAMPATTA EAST	MUHAMMED NOORUDHEEN	Member	INC	General

5	THATHNAMPULLY	MISITHA SOORAJ	Member	INDEPENDENT	Woman

6	THATHNAMPULLY SOUTH	RAJENDRANUNNI	Member	CPI(M)	General

7	MAPPATUKARA WEST	RAJAN POOTHANAYIL	Member	INDEPENDENT	General

8	MAPPATUKARA EAST	RATHEESH	Member	INC	SC

9	PURAMATHRA	V.RAMANI	Member	CPI(M)	Woman

10	PURAMATHRA SOUTH	PRASAD CHENDRATHODI	Member	BJP	General

11	KULUKKALLUR	RESMI RAJESH	Member	CPI(M)	Woman

12	ERAVATHRA	MUMTHAS LAILA KALIMADATHIL	Member	IUML	Woman

13	MULAYANKAVU SOUTH	ABDUL KAREEM	Member	IUML	General

14	MULAYANKAVU NORTH	SREEJA TEACHER	Member	CPI(M)	SC Woman

15	VANDUMTHARA	GOPAKUMAR	President	INC	General

16	VALIYAPARAMBU	KADEEJA MECHERIKUNNATH	Vice President	IUML	Woman

17	CHUNDAMPATTA WEST	VP.BULKEES YUSUF	Member	CPI(M)	Woman

Schools in Kulukkallur 

 Chundampatta GLPS (W)
 Chundampatta South ALPS
 Nattiyamangalam AM LPS
 Kulukkalloor GMLPS
 Kulukkalloor PVALPS
 Kulukkalloor West AMLPS
 Kulukkallur ALPS
 Chundampatta GUPS
 Chundampatta BV UPS
 Kulukkalloor AUPS
 Mulayankavu AUPS

See also
 Kulukkallur railway station

References

Villages in Palakkad district
Gram panchayats in Palakkad district